Paul Joseph Christman (March 5, 1918 – March 2, 1970) was an American football player and a member of the College Football Hall of Fame. A quarterback, he played college football for the University of Missouri in Columbia and professionally for the Chicago Cardinals and Green Bay Packers of the National Football League (NFL).

Collegiate career
A St. Louis native, Christman led the Missouri Tigers to a 20–8 record during his three seasons (1938–40) as their starting quarterback. He was a two-time All-American, and led the nation in touchdown passes in 1940. Christman was Missouri's all-time leading passer until 1976, when he was surpassed by Steve Pisarkiewicz. While at Mizzou, he was a member of the Kappa Sigma fraternity. His jersey number, 44, is one of seven retired by the school. In 1956, he was inducted into the College Football Hall of Fame.

National Football League career
He was a member of the so-called "Dream Backfield", which led the Chicago Cardinals to victory in the 1947 NFL Championship Game. A notoriously poor ball-handler, at one time he owned the record for most fumbles in a game (five) and most own fumbles recovered in a season (eight).

Broadcasting career
After retiring as a player, Christman worked as a television color commentator, first-teaming with play-by-play announcer Joe Boland to call Cardinals games for CBS in 1958 and 1959. In 1960 and 1961, he called college football games for ABC Sports alongside Curt Gowdy. In 1962, he began calling American Football League games on ABC with Gowdy, a pairing that continued after AFL rights shifted to NBC in 1965. Christman called Super Bowl I with Gowdy for NBC in January 1967.  In 1968–69 he returned to CBS, teaming with Ray Scott on NFL broadcasts.

Christman also called the collegiate Orange Bowl game for several years, teaming with Boland (1960), Scott (1961), and Gowdy (1962–67). He and Gowdy then called the Rose Bowl game in 1968.

Personal
Christman's daughter is noted Scientology critic Tory Christman. His older brother was Major League Baseball infielder Mark Christman (1913–1976).

Death
Christman died at age 51 in 1970 in Lake Forest, Illinois, from a heart attack. He had a history of heart trouble and was admitted to the hospital, where he died less than two days later. Christman was buried at All Saints Cemetery in Des Plaines, and was survived by his wife Inez and three adult children.

References

External links
 
 
 

1918 births
1970 deaths
American Football League announcers
American football quarterbacks
Chicago Cardinals players
College football announcers
College Football Hall of Fame inductees
Del Monte Pre-Flight Navyators football players
Green Bay Packers players
Missouri Tigers football players
National Football League announcers
Players of American football from St. Louis